The Asia/Oceania Zone was the unique zone within Group 4 of the regional Davis Cup competition in 2021. The zone's competition was held in round robin format in Isa Town, Bahrain, from 18 to 23 October 2021.

Participating nations

Inactive teams

Draw
Date: 18–23 October 2021

Location: Bahrain Tennis Federation Courts, Isa Town, Bahrain (hard)

Format: Round-robin basis. Three pools of four teams. The top two nations in each pool will play-off to determine which three nations are promoted to Asia/Oceania Group III in 2022.

Seeding

 1Davis Cup Rankings as of 20 September 2021

Round Robin

Pool A

Pool B

Pool C

Standings are determined by: 1. number of wins; 2. number of matches; 3. in two-team ties, head-to-head records; 4. in three-team ties, (a) percentage of sets won (head-to-head records if two teams remain tied), then (b) percentage of games won (head-to-head records if two teams remain tied), then (c) Davis Cup rankings.

Play-offs

Round Robin

Pool A

United Arab Emirates vs. Guam

Saudi Arabia vs. Bahrain

Saudi Arabia vs. Guam

United Arab Emirates vs. Bahrain

United Arab Emirates vs. Saudi Arabia

Guam vs. Bahrain

Pool B

Turkmenistan vs. Iraq

Oman vs. Mongolia

Oman vs. Iraq

Turkmenistan vs. Mongolia

Turkmenistan vs. Oman

Iraq vs. Mongolia

Pool C

Iran vs. Kyrgyzstan

Cambodia vs. Yemen

Cambodia vs. Kyrgyzstan

Iran vs. Yemen

Iran vs. Cambodia

Kyrgyzstan vs. Yemen

Play-offs

Promotional play-offs

Saudi Arabia vs. Cambodia

Turkmenistan vs. United Arab Emirates

Iran vs. Iraq

7th to 12th play-offs

Bahrain vs. Mongolia

Oman vs. Yemen

Kyrgyzstan vs. Guam

References

External links
Official Website

Davis Cup Asia/Oceania Zone
Asia